The 400-Mile Sale, sometimes referred to as the Highway 68 Yard Sale, is an outdoor second-hand sale held annually for four days, beginning in the first weekend of June. In 2020, it was rescheduled to October 2-4 due to the COVID-19 pandemic. It takes place along U.S. Route 68 (US 68) in the US state of Kentucky. It is held in almost all areas along the US 68 corridor from the east side of Paducah through central Kentucky, and ending at Maysville.

History

The 400 Mile Sale was founded in 2004 by Debbie Spencer whose goal was to bring awareness of antique and curiosity shops along the route. Leadership was passed to Judy Spencer in 2019. Tara Hall became the Director of the 400 Mile Sale in March, 2022.  

Counties along the route have always been the primary sponsors of the sale. The sponsors of the 2022 yard sale were Kentucky Lake/Marshall County Tourism, Cadiz/Trigg County Tourism, Visit Hopkinsville, City of Elkton, Logan County Tourism and Chamber of Commerce, Edmonton-Metcalfe Chamber of Commerce, Taylor County Tourism, Visit Lebanon, Perryville Main Street Association, Visit Harrodsburg, and Visit Jessamine. 
In 2023, the yard sales in Perryville will be sponsored by Perryville Outlet Furniture, the sale's first business sponsor.

Further information

400mile.com is your Treasure Map
In 2022, 400mile.com was revamped to include the popular Map My Route feature. Sellers and multisites register their sales and you can find each one plotted on Map My Route. The map can be sorted by day of sale, regional shopping, and by item types.

Areas exempt from the event
A  stretch of the concurrently running US 68 and KY 80 in the Land Between the Lakes National Recreation Area in western Trigg County is excluded from the yard sale route because the recreation area is the property of a government organization, the U.S. Forest Service. Another gap in the sale route is a  stretch of US 68 in Metropolitan Lexington and Fayette County, which is also excluded on account of high traffic volume, especially in downtown Lexington, where traffic is usually highly congested.

Other events in the area during the yard sale
A town-wide yard sale in the eastern Warren County town of Smiths Grove is often held during the US 68 Yard Sale just off the highway. Elkton, the Todd County seat also has a lot of yard sales during the event, even if on other streets. The Glasgow Highland Games at Barren River Lake State Resort Park, well south of the US 68 corridor along U.S. Route 31E, is often held during the same weekend as the 400 mile yard sale.

The 400-mile sale on television
During the event in June 2015, the 400-mile sale was featured on two cable television programs in the same week. In the early part of the event, Great American Country’s Endless Yard Sale, a competition show where two-person teams compete against each other in search of the best antique and vintage items. Small Town Big Deal, a syndicated documentary series focusing on stories in small town communities, also filmed along the yard sale route in 2015. Both shows filmed at various yard sale spots along the corridor from Cadiz to Bowling Green to Maysville. The event is also regularly publicized on the local level on ABC/Fox dual network affiliate WBKO in Bowling Green as that station's studio facilities are located on the yard sale route.

See also
127 Corridor Sale, the world's longest yard sale along US 127
Roller Coaster Fair, held in October along KY 63 and KY 90

References

External links

Glasgow/Barren County Tourism Commission
Bowling Green Convention and Visitor's Bureau
Mammoth Fun - Kentucky's Cave Country (Caveland Marketing Association)
Hopkinsville/Christian County Convention and Visitors Bureau

Annual events in Kentucky
Annual events in Tennessee
Tourist attractions in Kentucky
June events
Retail markets in the United States
U.S. Route 68
Kentucky Route 80
2004 establishments in Kentucky